Fabric 20 is a DJ mix compilation album by John Digweed, as part of the Fabric Mix Series. It was whittled down from a five-hour set based on Digweed's time at Fabric.

Genre
Fabric 20 is more similar to Digweed's Kiss FM radio show, rather than his previous progressive and house mixes. The first half is punctuated with a techy, electro vibe. The second half of the set features more of Digweed's uplifting sound that helped make him and Sasha a global phenomenon in the late 1990s.

Critical reaction
Many fans have commented that Digweed is "too commercial" or mainstream for an entry in the Fabric series. It received generally positive reviews, but some critics such as Pitchfork Media found the mix to be nothing particularly special.

Track listing
  Pete Moss - Strive To Live (16b Mix) - Alola Records
  Adam Johnson - Traber - Merck/Narita
  Repair - Forgive + Forget (Richard Davis Remix) - Sub Static Records
  DJ Rasoul - True Science - DJ Rasoul
  The Glass - Won't Bother Me (20:20 Mix) - Fine/Four Music
  Billy Dalessandro - In The Dark - Kompute Musik
  Bobby Peru - Venom - 20/20 Vision
  Martin Solveig - Rocking Music (Martin Solveig Dub) - Defected Records
  Slam - Lie To Me (FreestyleMan Thirsty Monk Dub) - Soma Records
  Angel Alanis - Knob Job - A Squared Muzik
  Infusion - Better World (Wink Interpretation) - BMG
  Superpitcher - Happiness (Michael Mayer Mix) - Kompakt
  Joel Mull - Emico - Elp
  Matrix - Vertigo (Goldtrix Remix) - Metro Recordings

References

External links

John Digweed albums
20
2005 compilation albums